The 2011 season was the Arizona Cardinals' 92nd in the National Football League (NFL), their 24th in Arizona and their fifth under head coach Ken Whisenhunt. This was going to be the Cardinals first season with new starting quarterback Kevin Kolb, but he was injured and replaced by John Skelton. Despite a 1-6 start the Cardinals managed to win 7 out of 9 games, including a stunning upset against the San Francisco 49ers in week 14. The team improved on their 5–11 record from the 2010 season, but missed the playoffs for a second consecutive season.

The 2011 Cardinals won four overtime games, an NFL record that would later be matched by the 2021 Las Vegas Raiders.

Offseason

Signings

Departures

2011 NFL Draft

Acquisitions
On July 28, 2011 the Cardinals acquired Kolb from the Philadelphia Eagles for CB Dominique Rodgers-Cromartie and a 2012 2nd-round pick. The next day they signed former Carolina Panthers starting CB Richard Marshall.

Preseason

Schedule

Regular season

Schedule

Game summaries

Week 1: vs. Carolina Panthers

Week 2: at Washington Redskins

Week 3: at Seattle Seahawks

Week 4: vs. New York Giants

Despite the Cardinals holding a 10-point lead twice in the fourth quarter, the Giants scored three touchdowns in the final frame as Arizona dropped its third straight game and fell to 1–3.

Week 5: at Minnesota Vikings

Week 7: vs. Pittsburgh Steelers

Coming off their bye week, the Cardinals went home for a Week 7 interconference duel with the Pittsburgh Steelers, in a rematch of Super Bowl XLIII.  Arizona trailed early in the first quarter as Steelers quarterback Ben Roethlisberger completed a 12-yard touchdown pass to tight end Heath Miller.  Pittsburgh would add onto their lead in the second quarter as  Roethlisberger completed a 95-yard touchdown pass to wide receiver Mike Wallace.  The Cardinals would answer with a 1-yard touchdown run from running back Alfonso Smith.  The Steelers would close out the half with kicker Shaun Suisham getting a 41-yard field goal.

Arizona opened the third quarter with quarterback Kevin Kolb finding running back LaRod Stephens-Howling on a 73-yard touchdown pass, but Pittsburgh struck back with Roethlisberger completing a 4-yard touchdown pass to wide receiver Emmanuel Sanders, along with Kolb's intentional grounding penalty in the endzone resulting in a safety.  In the fourth quarter, the Steelers continued to pull away with Suisham making a 42-yard and a 39-yard field goal.  The Cardinals tried to rally as Kolb found wide receiver Early Doucet on a 2-yard touchdown pass (with a failed two-point conversion), but Pittsburgh held on to preserve the victory.

With the loss, Arizona fell to 1–5.

Week 8: at Baltimore Ravens

The Cardinals blew a 21-point first half lead and lost their sixth straight game to fall to 1–6.

Week 9: vs. St. Louis Rams

The Cardinals snapped their six-game losing streak as rookie Patrick Peterson returned a punt 98 yards for a game-winning touchdown in overtime. With the win, the Cardinals improved to 2–6. The game also featured the Rams' scoring the four points in the third quarter as the got two safeties on consecutive drives. This was first time in NFL history that a team had recorded four points in a quarter.

Week 10: at Philadelphia Eagles

Week 11: at San Francisco 49ers

Week 12: at St. Louis Rams

Week 13: vs. Dallas Cowboys

Week 14: vs. San Francisco 49ers

The Cardinals came back from 12-point halftime deficit to stun the 10–2 49ers. With the win, the Cardinals improved to 6–7.

Week 15: vs. Cleveland Browns

Head coach Ken Whisenhunt recorded his 43rd win as the Cardinals' head coach, and surpassed Don Coryell to become the winningest head coach in franchise history. Whisenhunt was the all-time leader in wins for Cardinals head coaches until his record was broken by Bruce Arians 5 years later.

Week 16: at Cincinnati Bengals

Week 17: vs. Seattle Seahawks

Standings

Coaching staff

Final roster

Footnotes

References

Arizona Cardinals
Arizona Cardinals seasons
Arizona